Diogo Lucas Queirós (born 5 January 1999) is a Portuguese professional footballer who plays as a centre-back for F.C. Famalicão.

Club career

Porto
Born in Matosinhos, Porto District, Queirós joined FC Porto's youth system at the age of 11 from local club Leixões SC. He made his debut as a senior on 27 August 2017, playing 90 minutes for the reserve team in a 1–0 home win against C.D. Santa Clara in the LigaPro. The previous June, he had renewed his contract until 2021.

On 27 August 2019, Queirós was loaned to Royal Excel Mouscron of the Belgian First Division A. His maiden appearance in the competition took place three days later, in a 2–2 away draw with K.V. Mechelen. He played 21 total games during his spell, and scored in a 2–0 home victory over K.V. Kortrijk on 15 September.

Famalicão
Queirós signed a three-year deal with F.C. Famalicão on 6 October 2020. He appeared in his first Primeira Liga match on 7 November, starting and finishing the 2–1 home defeat of C.S. Marítimo.

On 31 August 2021, Queirós moved to Spanish Segunda División side Real Valladolid on a one-year loan deal with an option to buy. The following 30 January, after just eight competitive appearances, his loan was cut short.

Career statistics

Honours
Porto Youth
UEFA Youth League: 2018–19

Portugal
UEFA European Under-17 Championship: 2016
UEFA European Under-19 Championship: 2018

Individual
UEFA European Under-19 Championship Team of the Tournament: 2017
UEFA European Under-21 Championship Team of the Tournament: 2021

Orders
Medal of the Order of Merit

References

External links

1999 births
Living people
Sportspeople from Matosinhos
Portuguese footballers
Association football defenders
Primeira Liga players
Liga Portugal 2 players
FC Porto B players
F.C. Famalicão players
Belgian Pro League players
Royal Excel Mouscron players
Segunda División players
Real Valladolid players
Portugal youth international footballers
Portugal under-21 international footballers
Portuguese expatriate footballers
Expatriate footballers in Belgium
Expatriate footballers in Spain
Portuguese expatriate sportspeople in Belgium
Portuguese expatriate sportspeople in Spain